Dhira Phiphobmongkol (born 13 July 1934) is a Thai middle-distance runner. He competed in the men's 1500 metres at the 1960 Summer Olympics.

References

1934 births
Living people
Athletes (track and field) at the 1960 Summer Olympics
Dhira Phiphobmongkol
Dhira Phiphobmongkol
Place of birth missing (living people)